Del Mar is Spanish for "of the sea" or "from the sea".  It may refer to:

Places in the United States 
 Del Mar, California
 Del Mar High School, located in San Jose, California
 Del Mar racetrack, located in Del Mar, California
 Del Mar Fairgrounds located in Del Mar, California
Can also refer to the Delaware/Maryland area.

People 
 Alexander del Mar (1836–1926), US political economist
 Ennis Del Mar, a fictional character in Brokeback Mountain
 Jonathan Del Mar (born 1951), British music editor and conductor, son of Norman
 Norman Del Mar (1919–1994), British orchestral conductor, father of Jonathan
 Walter Del Mar (1862–1944), American banker and travel writer

Other
 "Del Mar" (song), by Ozuna featuring Doja Cat and Sia, 2020
 Viña del Mar, a Chilean coast city
 Café del Mar, a bar located in San Antonio, Ibiza
 Del Mar, a Glasspar boats model

See also 
 Delmar (disambiguation)